The 2021–22 Princeton Tigers women's basketball team represented Princeton University during the 2021–22 NCAA Division I women's basketball season. The Tigers, led by third-year head coach Carla Berube, played their home games at Jadwin Gymnasium as members of the Ivy League.

The Tigers finished the season with a 25–5 overall record, 14–0 in Ivy League play to finish in first place and win the conference's regular season championship.  As the top seed in the Ivy League Tournament, they defeated Harvard and Columbia to win the championship.  They received an automatic bid to the NCAA tournament, where they were the eleventh seed in the Bridgeport Region.  They defeated Kentucky in the First Round before losing to Indiana to end their season.

Previous season
The Ivy League canceled all winter sports for the 2020–21 season, including men's and women's basketball, due to COVID-19 concerns.

Roster

Schedule

Source:

|-
!colspan=6 style=| Regular season

|-
!colspan=6 style=| Ivy League Tournament

|-
!colspan=6 style=| NCAA tournament

Rankings

The Coaches Poll did not release a Week 2 poll and the AP Poll did not release a poll after the NCAA Tournament.

References

Princeton
Princeton Tigers women's basketball seasons
Princeton Tigers women's
Princeton Tigers women's
Princeton